Raiford Chatman "Ossie" Davis (December 18, 1917 – February 4, 2005) was an American actor, director, writer, and activist. He was married to Ruby Dee, with whom he frequently performed, until his death. He and his wife were named to the NAACP Image Awards Hall of Fame; were awarded the National Medal of Arts and were recipients of the Kennedy Center Honors. He was inducted into the American Theater Hall of Fame in 1994.

Early life
Raiford Chatman Davis was born in Cogdell, Georgia, the son of Kince Charles Davis, a railway construction engineer, and his wife Laura (née Cooper; July 9, 1898 – June 6, 2004). He inadvertently became known as "Ossie" when his birth certificate was being filed and his mother's pronunciation of his name as "R. C. Davis" was misheard by the courthouse clerk in Clinch County, Ga. Davis experienced racism from an early age when the KKK threatened to shoot his father, whose job they felt was too advanced for a black man to have.  His siblings included scientist William Conan Davis, social worker Essie Davis Morgan, pharmacist Kenneth Curtis Davis, and biology teacher James Davis.

Following the wishes of his parents, he attended Howard University but dropped out in 1939 to fulfill his desire for an acting career in New York after a recommendation by Alain Locke; he later attended Columbia University School of General Studies. His acting career began in 1939 with the Rose McClendon Players in Harlem.  During World War II, Davis served in the United States Army in the Medical Corps.  He made his film debut in 1950 in the Sidney Poitier film No Way Out.

Career

When Davis wanted to pursue a career in acting, he ran into the usual roadblocks that black people suffered at that time as they generally could only portray stereotypical characters such as Stepin Fetchit. Instead, he tried to follow the example of Sidney Poitier and play more distinguished characters. When he found it necessary to play a Pullman porter or a butler, he played those characters realistically, not as a caricature.

In addition to acting, Davis, along with Melvin Van Peebles and Gordon Parks, was one of the notable black directors of his generation: he directed movies such as Gordon's War, Black Girl and Cotton Comes to Harlem. Along with Bill Cosby and Poitier, Davis was one of a handful of black actors able to find commercial success while avoiding stereotypical roles prior to 1970, which also included a significant role in the 1965 movie The Hill alongside Sean Connery plus roles in The Cardinal and The Scalphunters. However, Davis never had the tremendous commercial or critical success that Cosby and Poitier enjoyed, though he starred with both of them in the 1975 film Let's Do It Again. As a playwright, Davis wrote Paul Robeson: All-American, which is frequently performed in theatre programs for young audiences.

In 1976, Davis appeared on Muhammad Ali's novelty album for children, The Adventures of Ali and His Gang vs. Mr. Tooth Decay.

Davis found recognition late in his life by working in several of director Spike Lee's films, including School Daze, Do The Right Thing, Jungle Fever, She Hate Me and Get on the Bus. He also found work as a commercial voice-over artist and served as the narrator of the early-1990s CBS sitcom Evening Shade, starring Burt Reynolds, where he also played one of the residents of a small southern town.  

Davis also appeared in several popular 1990s films, including Grumpy Old Men, The Client and Dr. Dolittle. In 1999, he appeared as a theater caretaker in the Trans-Siberian Orchestra film The Ghosts of Christmas Eve, which was released on DVD two years later.

For many years, he hosted the annual National Memorial Day Concert from Washington, D.C.

He voiced Anansi the spider on the PBS children's television series Sesame Street in its animation segments.

Davis's last role was a several episode guest role on the Showtime drama series The L Word, as a father struggling with the acceptance of his daughter Bette (Jennifer Beals) parenting a child with her lesbian partner. In his final episodes, his character took ill and died. His wife Ruby Dee was present during the filming of his own death scene. That episode, which aired shortly after Davis's own death, aired with a dedication to the actor. After Davis's passing, actor Dennis Haysbert portrayed him in the 2015 film Experimenter.

Honors 
In 1989, Ossie Davis and his wife, actress/activist Ruby Dee, were named to the NAACP Image Awards Hall of Fame. In 1995, they were awarded the National Medal of Arts, the nation's highest honor conferred to an individual artist on behalf of the country and presented in a White House ceremony by the President of the United States. In 2004, they were recipients of the prestigious Kennedy Center Honors. According to the Kennedy Center Honors: 
"The Honors recipients recognized for their lifetime contributions to American culture through the performing arts— whether in dance, music, theater, opera, motion pictures, or television — are selected by the Center's Board of Trustees. The primary criterion in the selection process is excellence. The Honors are not designated by art form or category of artistic achievement; the selection process, over the years, has produced balance among the various arts and artistic disciplines."

In 1994, Davis was inducted into the American Theater Hall of Fame.

Activism

Davis and Dee were well known as civil rights activists during the Civil Rights Movement and were close friends of Malcolm X, Jesse Jackson, Martin Luther King Jr. and other icons of the era. They were involved in organizing the 1963 civil rights March on Washington for Jobs and Freedom, and served as its emcees. Davis, alongside Ahmed Osman, delivered the eulogy at the funeral of Malcolm X. He re-read part of this eulogy at the end of Spike Lee's film Malcolm X. He also delivered a stirring tribute to Dr. Martin Luther King Jr, at a memorial in New York's Central Park the day after King was assassinated in Memphis, Tennessee.

Personal life

In 1948, Davis married actress Ruby Dee, whom he had met on the set of Robert Ardrey's 1946 play Jeb. In their joint autobiography With Ossie and Ruby, they described their decision to have an open marriage, later changing their minds. In the mid-1960s they moved to the New York suburb of New Rochelle, where they remained ever after. Their son Guy Davis is a blues musician and former actor, who appeared in the film Beat Street (1984) and the daytime soap opera One Life to Live. Their daughters are Nora Davis Day and Hasna Muhammad.

Death
Davis was found dead in a Miami Beach hotel room on February 4, 2005. He was 87 years old. An official cause of death was not released, but he was known to have had heart problems. His ashes were interred at Ferncliff Cemetery.

Davis's funeral was held in New York City on February 12, 2005. The line to enter The Riverside Church, located on the edge of Harlem, stretched for several blocks, with a thousand or more members of the public unable to attend as the church filled to its 2,100 capacity. Speakers included Davis's children and grandchildren, as well as Alan Alda, Burt Reynolds, Amiri Baraka, Avery Brooks, Angela Bassett, Spike Lee, Attallah Shabazz, Tavis Smiley, Maya Angelou, Sonia Sanchez, Harry Belafonte, and former president Bill Clinton, among many others. Wynton Marsalis performed a musical tribute. Burt Reynolds, who early in his career had worked with Davis, said "Ossie Davis took the bad parts of the South out of me.... I know what a  man is because of Ossie Davis." Ms. Shabazz, oldest daughter of Malcolm X and Betty Shabazz, spoke lovingly of the man she and her five sisters called Uncle Ossie, saying he had provided exceptional support to her and her sisters after her father's assassination. Bill Clinton arrived midway through the service, and said from the pulpit "I asked to be seated in the back. I would proudly ride on the back of Ossie Davis's bus any day," adding that Davis "would have made a great president."

Delivering the eulogy, Harry Belafonte said: Ossie Davis "embraced the greatest forces of our times. Paul Robeson, Dr. W.E.B. DuBois, Eleanor Roosevelt, A. Philip Randolph, Fannie Lou Hamer, Ella Baker, Thurgood Marshall, Dr. Martin Luther King Jr., Nelson Mandela, and so many, many more. At the time of one of our most anxious and conflicted moments, when 'Our America' was torn apart by seething issues of race, Ossie paused, at the tomb of one of our noblest warriors, and in the eulogy he delivered, insured that history would clearly understand the voice of Black people, and what Malcolm X meant to us in the African-American struggle for freedom.... It is hard to fathom that we will no longer be able to call on his wisdom, his humor, his loyalty and his moral strength to guide us in the choices that are yet to be made and the battles that are yet to be fought. But how fortunate we were to have him as long as we did."

Filmography

Film 

 No Way Out (1950) as John Brooks (uncredited)
 Fourteen Hours (1951) as Cab Driver (uncredited)
 The Joe Louis Story (1953) as Bob (uncredited)
 Gone Are the Days! (aka Purlie Victorious) (1963) as Reverend Purlie Victorious Judson
 The Cardinal (1963) as Father Gillis
 Shock Treatment (1964) as Capshaw
 The Hill (1965) as Jacko King
 A Man Called Adam (1966) as Nelson Davis
 Silent Revolution (1967)
 The Scalphunters (1968) as Joseph Lee
 Sam Whiskey (1969) as Jed Hooker
 Slaves (1969) as Luke
 Wattstax (1973) as himself (uncredited)
 Let's Do It Again (1975) as Elder Johnson
 Black Shadows on a Silver Screen (1975), a documentary
 Countdown at Kusini (1976) as Ernest Motapo
 Hot Stuff (1979) as Captain John Geiberger
 Benjamin Banneker: The Man Who Loved the Stars (1979)
 Harry & Son (1984) as Raymond
 The House of God (1984) as Dr. Sanders
 Avenging Angel (1985) as Captain Harry Moradian
 From Dreams To Reality: A Tribute to Minority Inventors (1986, Documentary) as himself
 School Daze (1988) as Coach Odom
 Do the Right Thing (1989) as Da Mayor
 Joe Versus the Volcano (1990) as Marshall
 Preminger: Anatomy of a Filmmaker (1991, Documentary) as himself
 Jungle Fever (1991) as The Good Reverend Doctor Purify
 Gladiator (1992) as Noah
 Malcolm X (1992) as Eulogy Performer (voice)
 Cop and a Half (1993) as Detective in Squad Room (uncredited)
 Grumpy Old Men (1993) as Chuck
 The Client (1994) as Harry Roosevelt
 Get on the Bus (1996) as Jeremiah
 I'm Not Rappaport (1996) as Midge Carter
 4 Little Girls (1997, Documentary) as himself - Actor and Playwright
 Dr. Dolittle (1998) as Archer Dolittle
 Alyson's Closet (1998, Short) as Postman Extraordinaire
 The Unfinished Journey (1999, Documentary, Short) as Narration (voice)
 The Gospel According to Mr. Allen (2000, Documentary) as Narrator
 Dinosaur (2000) as Yar (voice)
 Here's to Life! (2000) as Duncan Cox
 Voice of the Voiceless (2001, Documentary) as himself
 Why Can't We Be a Family Again? (2002, Documentary, Short) as Narrator (voice)
 Bubba Ho-Tep (2002) as Jack
 Unchained Memories (2003, Documentary) as Reader #6
 Nat Turner: A Troublesome Property (2003, Documentary) as himself
 Beah: A Black Woman Speaks (2003, Documentary) as himself
 BAADASSSSS! (2003) as Granddad
 She Hate Me (2004) as Judge Buchanan
 Proud (2004) as Lorenzo DuFau
 A Trumpet at the Walls of Jericho (2005, Documentary)

Television

 The Emperor Jones (1955, TV Movie) as Brutus Jones
 Seven Times Monday (1962, TV Movie) as Will
 Car 54 Where Are You? (1962-1963) as Officer Omar Anderson
 The Fugitive (1966) as Lieutenant Johnny Gaines
 12 O'Clock High (1967) as Major Glenn Luke
 Bonanza: The Wish (1969) as Sam Davis
 Night Gallery (1969) as Osmund Portifoy
 Hawaii Five-O (1974) as Ramon Borelle
 The Sheriff (1971, TV Movie) as Sheriff James Lucas
 The Tenth Level (1976, TV Movie) as Reed
 Billy: Portrait of a Street Kid (1977, TV Movie) as Dr. Fredericks
 King (1978, TV Mini-Series) as Reverend Martin Luther King Sr.
 Roots: The Next Generations (1979, TV Mini-Series) as Dad Jones
 Freedom Road (1979, TV Movie) as Narrator
 All God's Children (1980, TV Movie) as Blaine Whitfield
 Ossie and Ruby! (1980) as Co-host (1980-1981)

 Don't Look Back: The Story of Leroy "Satchel" Paige (1981, TV Movie) as Chuffy Russell
 Death of a Prophet (1981, TV Movie) as himself
 Benjamin Banneker: The Man Who Loved the Stars (1989)
 B.L. Stryker (1989–1990) as 'Oz' Jackson
 We'll Take Manhattan (1990, TV Movie) as Man in Subway
 Evening Shade (1990–1994) as Ponder Blue
 Alex Haley's Queen (1993, TV Mini-Series) as Parson Dick
 The Ernest Green Story (1993, TV Movie) as Grandfather
 The Stand (1994, TV Mini-Series) as Judge Richard Farris
 Ray Alexander (1995, TV Movie) as Uncle Phil
 The Android Affair (1995, TV Movie) as Dr. Winston
 The Client (1995–1996) as Judge Harry Roosevelt
 Home of the Brave (1996, TV Movie) as Erasmus Jones
 Promised Land (1996–1998) as Erasmus Jones

 Touched By An Angel (1996–2002) as Erasmus Jones / Gabriel / Gabe
 Miss Evers' Boys (1997, TV Movie) as Mr. Evers
 12 Angry Men (1997, TV Movie) as Juror #2
 The Secret Path (1999, TV Movie) as 'Too Tall'
 The Soul Collector (1999, TV Movie) as Mordecai
 The Ghosts of Christmas Eve (1999, TV Movie) as The Caretaker
 A Vow to Cherish (1999, TV Movie) as Alexander Billman
 Between the Lions (1999–2005)
 Finding Buck McHenry (2000, TV Movie) as Buck McHenry
 Legend of the Candy Cane (2001, TV Movie) as Julius (voice)
 The Feast of All Saints (2001, TV Movie) as Jean-Jacques
 Persidio Med (2002) as Otis Clayton
 Deacons for Defense (2003, TV Movie) as Reverend Gregory
 JAG (2003) as Terrence Minnerly
 The L Word (2004–2005) as Melvin Porter (final appearance)

Video game
 Ripper (1996) as Ben Dodds

Directing
 Cotton Comes to Harlem (1970)
 Black Girl (1972)
 Gordon's War (1973)
 Kongi's Harvest (1973)
 Countdown at Kusini (1976)
 Crown Dick (1987 TV movie)

Theatre

Discography
 Autobiography of Frederick Douglass, Vol. 1: (Folkways Records, 1966)
 Autobiography of Frederick Douglass, Vol. 2: (Folkways, 1966)
 Frederick Douglass' The Meaning of July 4 for the Negro: (Folkways, 1975)
 Frederick Douglass' Speeches inc. The Dred Scott Decision: (Folkways, 1976)

Books

References

External links

 The official site of Ossie Davis & Ruby Dee
 Life's Essentials with Ruby Dee
 
 
 
 
 
 Eulogy of Malcolm X
 Ossie Davis' oral history video excerpts at The National Visionary Leadership Project
 Ossie Davis at Smithsonian Folkways
 
 

1917 births
2005 deaths
African-American activists
21st-century American male actors
20th-century American male actors
Activists for African-American civil rights
Activists from New York (state)
African-American male actors
African-American film directors
American male film actors
American male stage actors
American male television actors
United States Army personnel of World War II
Caedmon Records artists
Columbia University School of General Studies alumni
Daytime Emmy Award winners
Grammy Award winners
Howard University alumni
Kennedy Center honorees
People from Clinch County, Georgia
Male actors from New Rochelle, New York
People from Waycross, Georgia
Screen Actors Guild Life Achievement Award
United States National Medal of Arts recipients
Film directors from Georgia (U.S. state)
African-American history of Westchester County, New York